Jamil Walker Smith (born August 20, 1982) is an American actor, director, producer and writer. His best known role is as the voice of Gerald, a fourth grader and Arnold's best friend in the Nickelodeon animated TV series Hey Arnold!. He also appeared on several shows like Sister, Sister; Girlfriends; Bones; The X-Files; and The Bernie Mac Show. He is an actor by trade and writes, acts and directs his own short film projects. He played Master Sergeant Ronald Greer in both seasons of Stargate Universe.

Early life
Smith was born on August 20, 1982 in New York City, New York. Smith has been a professional actor since the age of 6, performing in local theaters in Los Angeles, where he was nominated for two NAACP Theatre Awards and was selected as a California Arts Scholar.  Smith's first job in the business was at the age of 12, guest starring in an episode of the Fox sitcom The Sinbad Show. Smith majored in Theater Arts at SUNY Purchase. Smith is managed by Luber Roklin Entertainment.

Career
Smith wrote, directed and fully financed The American Dream, a narrative feature for which he won the New Visions Award at Cinequest and Best Director at Urbanworld Film Festival. Smith most recently starred in the latest feature from the Bellflower filmmakers, Chuck Hank and the San Diego Twins. Smith also appeared on NBC's Ironside, and was a series regular on the Syfy Network's Stargate Universe. Smith wrote and directed the short film, The Son, which premiered at Urbanworld, where he met programmer Brittany Ballard and together they decided to launch Little Plow Films. Smith co-wrote and directed I Want to be Ready, the screen adaptation of Ayelet Waldman's acclaimed novel, Daughter's Keeper, for which he holds the film/TV option. Smith is currently premiering Wild Geese, his first short work as co-writer/co-director at international film festivals throughout 2013-2014, while he develops his third feature, Steal That Horse, an original narrative he co-wrote, will co-direct and star in this fall. Smith has also written The Pyn, a satirical romp through the prison industrial complex, which he plans to direct in 2015. Smith teaches acting at Baldwin Hills Elementary School. Smith won the 2013 New Leaders Council "40 Under 40" Media Leadership Award. He appeared on General Hospital in 2014 as "Immigration Agent" Jeffery Scribner.

Filmography

Film

Television

Video games

References

External links
 
 
 

1982 births
African-American male actors
American male child actors
American male television actors
American male voice actors
Living people
State University of New York at Purchase alumni
21st-century African-American people
20th-century African-American people